Neckartenzlingen is a town in the district of Esslingen in Baden-Württemberg in southern Germany.

Geography
It is located 10 km north of Reutlingen, and 25 km south of Stuttgart.

Twin towns — sister cities
Neckartenzlingen is twinned with:

  Komló, Hungary

People 
 Gottlob Bauknecht (1892-1976), German businessman

References

Esslingen (district)
Populated places on the Neckar basin
Populated riverside places in Germany